Santa Luzia is a Brazilian municipality located in the state of Minas Gerais. The city belongs to the mesoregion Metropolitana de Belo Horizonte and to the microregion of Belo Horizonte. Its population in 2020 was 220,444.

See also
 List of municipalities in Minas Gerais

References

Municipalities in Minas Gerais